Ehrlich is a German/Yiddish surname, meaning "honest" or "honorable". Notable people with the surname include:

 Abel Ehrlich (1915–2003), Israeli composer of symphony music
 Alojzy Ehrlich (1914–1992), Polish table tennis player
 Anne H. Ehrlich (born 1933), U.S. author of books on overpopulation and ecology 
 Arnold Ehrlich (1848–1919), biblical and rabbinical scholar who was born in Poland and immigrated to the U.S.
 David Ehrlich, senior film critic at IndieWire
 Dieter Ehrlich (born 1941), German field hockey player
 Eugen Ehrlich (1862–1922), Austrian legal scholar
 Eugene Ehrlich (1922–2008), U.S. lexicographer and author
 Felix Ehrlich (1877–1942), German chemist and biochemist
 Franz Ehrlich (1907–1984), German architect
 Gertrude Ehrlich (born 1923), Austrian-American mathematician
 Georg Ehrlich (1897–1966), Austrian-born sculptor, also active in the UK
 Gretel Ehrlich (born 1946), U.S. travel writer
 Howard J. Ehrlich, U.S. sociologist and anarchist activist
 Jacques Ehrlich, (1893–1953), World War I flying ace
 Jake Ehrlich, (1900–1971), U.S. attorney and author who was the model for Perry Mason and Sam Benedict
 Jakob Ehrlich (1877–1938), Austrian Zionist killed in the Nazi concentration camp, Dachau 
 Jonathan Erlich (born 1977), Israeli tennis player
 Joseph Ehrlich (1914–2003) (Dr Joe Ehrlich), founded EMC Motorcycles after emigrating from Austria to Great Britain in 1930s
 Kendel Ehrlich (born 1961), former first lady of Maryland
 Lambert Ehrlich (1878–1942), Slovene Roman Catholic priest, political figure, and ethnologist
 Marty Ehrlich (b. 1955), U.S. jazz musician
 Max Ehrlich (1892–1944), German actor, director and master of ceremony
 Paul Ehrlich (1854–1915), German scientist who won the 1908 Nobel Prize in Physiology or Medicine and developed the ehrlich reagent
 Paul R. Ehrlich (born 1932), U.S. biologist and Professor of Population Studies at Stanford University
 Ricardo Ehrlich, (born 1948), Uruguayan politician
 Robert "Bob" Leroy Ehrlich (born 1957), U.S. politician and former governor of Maryland
Robert Ehrlich (physicist) (born 1938)
Rotem Erlich (born 1969), Israeli basketball player
Simon M. Ehrlich (1852–1895), American lawyer and judge
 S. Paul Ehrlich Jr. (1937–2005), acting Surgeon General of the United States from 1973 to 1977
 Steven Ehrlich (born 1946), American architect
 Thomas Ehrlich (born 1934) consulting professor at the Stanford Graduate School of Education, president of Indiana University 1987-1994
 Walter Ehrlich (1896–1968), German philosopher
 William Ehrlich (1894–1923), German Nazi who was killed in the attempted coup of 1923 called the Beer Hall Putsch
 Yakov Ehrlich (born 1988), Russian professional football (soccer) player
 Yom-Tov Ehrlich (1914–1990), Hasidic musician born in Poland who immigrated to the U.S.

Erlich, Erlikh 
 Dennis Erlich, U.S. scientologist
 Esther Erlich, Australian artist
 Jonathan Erlich (born 1977), Israeli tennis player
 Leandro Erlich, Argentine conceptual artist
 Paul Erlich (born 1972), American music theorist
Erlich Bachman, fictional character in Silicon Valley (TV series)

Ehrlichmann, Ehrlichman, Erlichman 
John Ehrlichman, (1925–1999), assistant to U.S. President Richard Nixon, convicted in Watergate scandal
Jonathan Erlichman, Canadian baseball coach

See also
Ehrich (disambiguation), a similarly spelled surname

German-language surnames
Jewish surnames
Surnames from nicknames